The 1962 season was the Hawthorn Football Club's 38th season in the Victorian Football League and 61st overall. Hawthorn entered the season as the defending VFL premiers.

Fixture

Premiership season

Night series

Ladder

References

Hawthorn Football Club seasons